The 2018 FIG World Cup circuit in Artistic Gymnastics was a series of competitions officially organized and promoted by the International Gymnastics Federation (FIG) in 2018.

Schedule

World Cup series

World Challenge Cup series

Medalists

Men

World Cup series

World Challenge Cup series

World Challenge Cup series winners

Women

World Cup series

World Challenge Cup series

World Challenge Cup series winners

See also
 2018 FIG Rhythmic Gymnastics World Cup series

References

Artistic
Artistic Gymnastics World Cup